Knapman is an English surname.

Notable people
Notable people with this surname include:
 Ernie Knapman, English rugby player
 Gareth Knapman, English theatre actor and director
 Paul Knapman, English coroner
 Roger Knapman, British politician
 Steve Knapman, Australian television producer
 William Knapman (1830–1908), South Australian hotel owner and brewer

References